Pocong vs Kuntilanak is a 2008 horror film, directed and written by David Purnomo, and produced by Zainal Susanto. The main cast consists of Ahmad Zaki, Alia Rosa, and Aldiansyah Taher.

Plot 
The film starts in the Dutch Colonial Era of Indonesia, where we are informed of Raden Soekotjo's feelings toward Nyi Soroh. As the film opens, Raden is going to Nyi's house to tell her of his feelings for her. She however, has already fallen in love and married a Dutch sea captain named Von Klingen. Angered by that prospect, Raden killed Nyi, which awakened her family's Kuntilanak spirit guardian. Heading after Von Klingen next, Raden became when he found out that the Kuntilanak was after him. He tries to escape, but the Kuntilanak kills him. Before death however, Raden tells one of his relatives not to undo the rope around his pocong shroud, which would allow him to turn into a Pocong spirit. Throughout the generations both the Soekotjo and the Von Klingen families are dragged into a war between the family's guardians, the Pocong, and the Kuntilanak respectively. Until finally, the movie centers itself around the most recent generation which consists of Marcell Soekotjo and Vonny Von Klingen. It is revealed to us that Vonny is a high school girl, with two best friends Bi, and Noo. Noo, is boyfriends with Sa, whose best friend is Big, a tattooist. We learn also that Big's boss happens to be none other than Marcell Soekotjo, the aforementioned descendant of Raden Soekotjo. After the girl's visit Big, and Marcell at the tattoo parlor, they later go to Vonny's house, where under Sa's influence they decide to summon a Pocong. Meanwhile, the Kuntilanak, realizing that Vonny is its new caste, goes to Vonny's as well to start protecting her from harm. When the Kuntilanak finally arrives, it frightens the group of friends enough, that they desperately call out for the Pocong spirit's help. As it arrives, it manages to ward of the Kuntilanak for the moment, but not before officially reopening the family feud. Following this encounter Vonny goes to her grandmother for information, and is informed that unless Vonny agrees to take control of the Kuntilanak, and learns how to control it, the creature will continue to go on its rampage. Eventually the Pocong takes possession of Marcell, and uses his body to fight the Kuntilanak head to head at an even clip. When they meet Marcell's mother Agnes, she informs them that the only way to end there accursed feud, is for Vonny to marry Marcell. Agreeing to the conditions, based on her deep affections for Marcell throughout the movie, Vonny takes the ring, and the Pocong's rope is untied, ending its control over Marcell. The Kuntilanak disappears as well as Vonny and her family are no longer in danger from any of the Soekotjo family, or anyone else.

Cast
 Ahmed Zaki
 Allya Rossa
 Aldiansyah Taher
 Ikhasan Samiaji
 Puspita Diana
 Amanda Faried

References

External links
 

2008 films
2008 horror films
Indonesian horror films
Indonesian ghost films
2000s Indonesian-language films